Mexicana Universal Coahuila is a pageant in Coahuila, Mexico, that selects that state's representative for the national Mexicana Universal pageant.

The State Organization has produced one Winner for Miss Universe titleholder in 2002 being the first and only winner from the state to win one crown of Nuestra Belleza México/Mexicana Universal.

Mexicana Universal Coahuila is located at number 12 with one crown of Nuestra Belleza México.

Titleholders
Below are the names of the annual titleholders of Nuestra Belleza Coahuila 1994-2016, Mexicana Universal Coahuila 2017, and their final placements in the Mexicana Universal.

 Competed in Miss Universe.
 Competed in Miss World.
 Competed in Miss International.
 Competed in Miss Charm International.
 Competed in Miss Continente Americano.
 Competed in Reina Hispanoamericana.
 Competed in Miss Orb International.
 Competed in Nuestra Latinoamericana Universal.

Designated Contestants
As of 2000, isn't uncommon for some States to have more than one delegate competing simultaneously in the national pageant. The following Nuestra Belleza Coahuila contestants were invited to compete in Nuestra Belleza México.

External links
Official Website

Nuestra Belleza México